Helen Frank (born 1930) is an American artist from New York and New Jersey. She is known for her etchings and watercolors of New York City, New Jersey, arts appreciation, cultural identity, immigration, women's issues, sports, travel and daily life.

Her work is in the collections of the Library Of Congress, New York Public Library, New-York Historical Society, Museum of Modern Art, Victoria and Albert Museum, New Jersey State Museum, Newark Public Library, American Museum of Immigration, UNICEF, Lafayette College, New Jersey Center for Visual Arts, Saks Fifth Avenue and New York Life Insurance Company, New York Mets, Drumthwacket and Habitat for Humanity.

Her work has been compared to Daumier by the New York Times.

In 2008, Frank, in collaboration with her daughter, created an art and poetry collection based on the lives of the cloistered nuns at the Monastery of Our Lady of the Rosary.

In 2013, she was on the Griffin Art Prize Shortlist.

Education
 Yale
New School
Temple University, Tyler School of Fine Arts
Art Students League of New York
 Cooper Union

References

American contemporary artists
1930 births
Living people
American women printmakers
Artists from New Jersey
Artists from New York (state)
20th-century American printmakers
21st-century American printmakers
20th-century American women artists
21st-century American women artists